Peter Tomko (born 1 May 1984 in Trebišov) is a professional Slovakian association footballer currently playing for Tatran Liptovský Mikuláš in Slovak 2. liga.

Career
Tomko was signed by Geylang United for their 2010 S.League season. He played for Geylang in the 2010 AFC Cup group stage scoring twice, once against Thai Port F.C. in a 2-2 draw, and once against SHB Đà Nẵng F.C. in their final group game which they drew 1-1. He also scored for Geylang in their 2-1 loss to Balestier Khalsa in the 2010 Singapore Cup.

References

External links
 

1984 births
Living people
Slovak footballers
Association football forwards
Expatriate footballers in Singapore
Singapore Premier League players
MFK Ružomberok players
Expatriate footballers in the Czech Republic
Geylang International FC players
MFK Tatran Liptovský Mikuláš players
Sportspeople from Trebišov
SK Sparta Krč players